Job: A Masque for Dancing is a one act ballet produced for the Vic-Wells Ballet in 1931. Regarded as a crucial work in the development of British ballet, Job was the first ballet to be produced by an entirely British creative team.  The original concept and libretto for the ballet was proposed by the scholar Geoffrey Keynes, with choreography by Ninette de Valois, music by Ralph Vaughan Williams, orchestrations by Constant Lambert and designs by Gwendolen Raverat. The ballet is based on the Book of Job from the Hebrew Bible and was inspired by the illustrated edition by William Blake, published in 1826.  Job had its world premiere on 5 July 1931, and was performed for members of the Camargo Society at the Cambridge Theatre, London. The first public performance of the ballet took place on 22 September 1931 at the Old Vic Theatre.

Development
The concept for a ballet based on the Book of Job was first proposed by the scholar Geoffrey Keynes, who was a respected authority on the work of William Blake.

Music
The music for the ballet, titled Job: A Masque for Dancing, was written by the British composer Ralph Vaughan Williams. Vaughan Williams called it a "masque" because he disliked the word "ballet", but the work has no connection with the genre of masque. He began writing the score after the idea for the ballet was initially proposed to the Russian ballet impresario Sergei Diaghilev, who rejected it. As a result, the music was first written for a larger orchestra than could be accommodated in a conventional theatre pit and had its premiere in concert form in October 1930 at the Norfolk and Norwich Festival, with Vaughan Williams conducting. When the ballet was eventually produced, the music was orchestrated for a small orchestra by Constant Lambert.

The full orchestral version is scored for three flutes (third doubling on piccolo and alto flute), two oboes, cor anglais, two clarinets (in Bb), alto saxophone, bass clarinet (doubling on third clarinet in Bb), two bassoons, contrabassoon, four horns (in F), three trumpets (in Bb), three trombones, tuba, timpani, triangle, side drum, cymbals, bass drum, xylophone, glockenspiel, tam tam, organ, two harps, and strings.

Vaughan Williams dedicated the score to the conductor Adrian Boult in 1934, after the composer had learned that the Bach Choir, which Boult had directed, raised funds towards the engraving of the full score of Job for publication as a parting gift to Boult. Boult made four commercial recordings of the work, including the first recording in 1946 with the BBC Symphony Orchestra; his fourth and final recording was taped in 1970 with the London Symphony Orchestra.

O.A. Weltzien has written a detailed analysis of Blake's illustrations and Vaughan Williams' score. F.W.D. Ries published an article containing reminiscences by Keynes of the original production and the later 1948 production.

Performance history
The ballet was first performed by the Vic-Wells Ballet, with financial backing from the Camargo Society. It received its world premiere on 5 July 1931 and was staged for members of the society, at the Cambridge Theatre in London's West End theatre district. The role of Satan was performed by Anton Dolin, with Stanley Judson dancing the role of Elihu. The ballet subsequently received its public premiere on 22 September 1931 at the Old Vic Theatre. An adapted version of the ballet was also performed outdoors as part of the Lewisohn Stadium concerts, New York City in 1931, staged by Ted Shawn.

1948 revival
The first major revival of Job: A Masque for Dancing took place on 20 May 1948, at the Royal Opera House, Covent Garden, London. By this time, the Vic-Wells Ballet had become known as the Sadler's Wells Ballet and had relocated from Sadler's Wells Theatre to become the resident ballet company at the opera house. Due to the significantly larger stage, Raverat's original set designs we no longer suitable for the ballet, so new designs were commissioned, produced by John Piper.

The cast included:
Donald Britton
John Cranko
Leslie Edwards
Julia Farron
John Field
Alexander Grant
Robert Helpmann
Rowena Jackson
Gillian Lynne
Nadia Nerina
Michael Somes

Sections

The ballet includes 9 scenes, loosely based upon the sequence of Blake's illustrations and each including in the synopsis a quotation from the Bible. Vaughan Williams headed his score with 18 section headings.

 Scene I: "Saraband of the Sons of God" ("Hast thou considered my servant Job?")
– Introduction
– Pastoral Dance
– Satan's Appeal to God
– Saraband of the Sons of God
 Scene II: "Satan's Dance of Triumph" ("So Satan went forth from the presence of the Lord.")
– Satan's Dance
 Scene III: "Minuet of the Sons of Job and Their Wives" ("There came a great wind and smote the four corners of the house and it fell upon the young men and they are dead.")
– Minuet of the Sons and Daughters of Job
 Scene IV: "Job's Dream" ("In thoughts from the visions of the night....fear came upon me and trembling.")
– Job's Dream
– Dance of Plague, Pestilence, Famine and Battle
 Scene V: "Dance of the Three Messengers" ("There came a messenger.")
– Dance of the Messengers
 Scene VI: "Dance of Job's Comforters" ("Behold happy is the man whom God correcteth.")
– Dance of Job's Comforters
– Job's Curse
– A Vision of Satan
 Scene VII: "Elihu's Dance of Youth and Beauty" ("Ye are old and I am very young.")
– Elihu's Dance of Youth and Beauty
– Pavane of the Heavenly Host
 Scene VIII: "Pavane of the Sons of the Morning" ("All the Sons of God shouted for joy.")
– Galliard of the Sons of the Morning
– Altar Dance and Heavenly Pavane
 Scene IX: "Epilogue" ("So the Lord blessed the latter end of Job more than his beginning.")

References

Ballets by Ninette de Valois
Ballets by Ralph Vaughan Williams
1931 ballet premieres
Ballets created for The Royal Ballet
1931 compositions
Adaptations of works by William Blake
Music based on art
Fiction about the Devil
Fiction about God
Book of Job
Ballets premiered in London